Zhenda Glacier is the 8 km long and 4.8 km wide glacier on the east side of the main crest of northern Sentinel Range in Ellsworth Mountains, Antarctica.  It is situated west of Sabazios Glacier and southeast of Skaklya Glacier.  The glacier drains the northeast slopes of Mount Sharp and the east slopes of Mount Barden, flows northeastwards and together with Skaklya Glacier joins Sabazios Glacier west of Mount Lanning in Sostra Heights.

The glacier is named after the settlement of Zhenda in Southern Bulgaria.

Location
US mapping in 1961.

See also
 List of glaciers in the Antarctic
 Glaciology

Maps
 Newcomer Glacier.  Scale 1:250 000 topographic map.  Reston, Virginia: US Geological Survey, 1961.
 Antarctic Digital Database (ADD). Scale 1:250000 topographic map of Antarctica. Scientific Committee on Antarctic Research (SCAR). Since 1993, regularly updated.

References
 Zhenda Glacier SCAR Composite Gazetteer of Antarctica
 Bulgarian Antarctic Gazetteer Antarctic Place-names Commission (Bulgarian)
 Basic data (English)

External links
 Zhenda Glacier. Copernix satellite image

Glaciers of Ellsworth Land
Bulgaria and the Antarctic